Jodo Shinshu Hongwanji-ha (official name), commonly called Honganji-ha, is a Japanese Buddhist organization. It is a sub-sect within Jodo Shinshu. Its head temple is Nishi Hongan-ji. It is the largest Jodo Shinshu sub-sect, the second largest being Otani-ha.

Hongwanji-ha has declared itself against the Iraq War. It has millions of members.

References

Schools of Jōdo Shinshū
Shinshū Honganji-ha